The Diccionario de la lengua española (DLE;), previously known as Diccionario de la Real Academia Española (DRAE), is produced, edited, and published by the Royal Spanish Academy (RAE) with participation of the Association of Academies of the Spanish Language. It was first published in 1780, and subsequent editions have been published about once a decade. The twenty-third edition was published in 2014; it is available online, incorporating modifications to be included in the twenty-fourth print edition.

The Dictionary was created to maintain the linguistic purity of the Spanish language; unlike many English-language dictionaries, the DLE is intended to be authoritative and prescriptive, rather than descriptive.

Origin and development

Purpose
When the RAE was founded in 1713, one of its primary objectives was to compile an authoritative Castilian Spanish dictionary. Its first statutes said in 1715 that the Academy's purpose was to:
 The RAE's original motto of limpia, fija y da esplendor (clean, stabilise, and give splendour [to the language]) was in more recent times modified to unifica, limpia y fija (unify, clean, and stabilise). In 1995 it was still expected to "establish and spread the criteria of propriety and correctness".

Despite this policy, in the 21st century the Academy has responded to criticism about definitions considered to be derogatory or racist such as trapacero ("swindler") for gitano ("gypsy") by saying that the Dictionary tries to reflect actual usage, and that nothing is changed by removing the definition from the dictionary, education must be used to eradicate inappropriate usages. However, after refusing to change some definitions, they were ultimately changed. See the section Criticism below for examples.

Editions
The first dictionary was the six-volume Diccionario de Autoridades (Dictionary of Authorities) from 1726 to 1739. Based on that work, an abridged version was published in 1780, the full title of which was Diccionario de la lengua castellana compuesto por la Real Academia Española, reducido á un tomo para su más fácil uso (Dictionary of the Castilian tongue composed by the Royal Spanish Academy, reduced to one volume for its easier use). According to its prologue, the dictionary was published for general public access during the long time between the publishing of the first and second editions of the exhaustive Diccionario de Autoridades, thus offering a cheaper reference book. By the time the second edition was published, it had become the principal dictionary, superseding its ancestor.

The fourth edition of the dictionary (1803) introduced the digraphs "ch" (che) and "ll" (elle) to the Spanish alphabet as separate, discrete letters. Entries starting with "ch" were placed after all the "c" entries (so czarda appeared before chacal), and "ll" entries after "l". Also in 1803, the letter "x" was replaced with "j" when it had the same pronunciation as "j", and the circumflex accent (^) was eliminated. In 1994, it was decided at the 10th Congress of the Association of Academies of the Spanish Language to use the universal Latin alphabet, which does not include "ch" and "ll" as single letters.

The earliest editions were more extensive: they included Latin translations of the entry, in some cases gave usage examples (especially in popular phrases), and summarized the word's etymology; contemporary editions do so concisely. The earliest editions had "x" entries that no longer appear individually.

Historically, the decision to add, modify, or delete words from the dictionary has been made by the RAE, in consultation with other language authorities (especially in Latin America) when there was an uncertainty. This process continued between 1780 and 1992, but, since the 1992 edition, RAE committees, the Instituto de Lexicografía, and the Association of Academies of the Spanish Language—which specifically deals with American vocabulary—collaborate in producing the Dictionary of the Spanish Language.

List of editions
The editions are listed on the RAE Web site, and the forewords of former editions can be accessed from there. Some editions, including the 1726–1739 Diccionario de autoridades, are available in facsimile, or for online search.

Formats
Until the twenty-first edition, the DLE was published exclusively on paper. The 2001, twenty-second edition was published on paper, CD-ROM, and on the Internet with free access. The 23rd edition of 2014 was made available online with free access, incorporating modifications to be included in the twenty-fourth print edition.

Sample entries, with explanation of annotations and abbreviations, are available from the RAE Web site.

Previous titles
From the first edition (1780) through the fourth edition (1803), the dictionary was known as the Diccionario de la lengua castellana compuesto por la Real Academia Española (Dictionary of the Castilian language composed by the Spanish Royal Academy). From the fifth edition (1817) through the fourteenth edition (1914), it was known as the Diccionario de la lengua castellana por la Real Academia Española (Dictionary of the Castilian language by the Spanish Royal Academy). Starting with the fifteenth edition (1925), it has been known as the Diccionario de la lengua española (Dictionary of the Spanish language), to recognise the many regions of the Spanish-speaking world.

Criticism

Pejorative definitions
Many Spanish dictionaries have had racial and religious bias over the centuries; the DRAE is no exception. Christianity and Catholicism were described in favourable terms; Judaism, Islam, and Protestantism unfavourably. By 2021 few biased definitions remained in the updated online DRAE; one that could be considered biased is one of the uses of moro (Moor, i.e. Muslim) – 10: (colloquial) A jealous and possessive man, who dominates his partner.

In 2006, the Spanish Federation of Jewish Communities complained that some of the dictionary's entries and definitions about Judaism were racist and offensive.  One definition of sinagoga (synagogue) was: "a meeting for illicit ends"; the nominal definition of 'synagogue' was given first, and the pejorative definition was so identified. This had been removed by 2021.

In November 2014, Romani in Spain complained about RAE at the European Court of Human Rights. Yerba-buena, an association of Spanish gitanos ("gypsies" in English), complained that one definition of Gitano: "one who practices deceit" or "one who tricks", is offensive and could encourage racism. The RAE responded that the word gitano is actually used with the meaning of "trickster" in Spanish, and that the dictionary documents the actual use of words; inappropriate use has to be eradicated by education, removing the word from the dictionary does not change its use: "we simply photograph the landscape; we do not create it". However, in November 2014 it was announced that the definition was to be modified, and in October 2015 it was changed, with trapacero included in the definitions in the updated online dictionary, but labelled "used as offensive or discriminatory".

RAE also defined "woman" as the "weak sex". In November 2017, the term was examined and one month later it was changed.

See also
Descriptive linguistics
Linguistic prescription

References

External links
 Tesoro Lexicográfico de la lengua española, database with digital copies of all of the dictionaries edited and published by the RAE.
 Real Academia Española webpage, with links to both the online version of the dictionary and the one of the Diccionario panhispánico de dudas.

Spanish dictionaries
Spanish language
1780 non-fiction books